The 1979–80 season was Port Vale's 68th season of football in the Football League, and their second successive season (eighth overall) in the Fourth Division. One of the club's worst ever seasons, Vale finished twentieth in the league, and exited both cup competitions at the first stage. They also lost a tremendous amount of money. There was also a managerial merry-go-round, with Dennis Butler replaced by Alan Bloor, who was in turned replaced by John McGrath, with Bill Bentley also spending a short period as caretaker-manager.

Overview

Fourth Division
The pre-season saw manager Dennis Butler sign three players on free transfers: Terry Owen (Rochdale), Alan Woolfall (Bury), and Steve Jones (Manchester United). Meanwhile, the club was fined £500 by The Football Association for the team's ongoing poor disciplinary record.

The season began with four straight league defeats, which resulted in the dismissal of Butler as manager. Alan Bloor took over as caretaker manager, who threatened the players with a place on the bench if they failed to deliver in the first eleven, to prove his point he replaced Bernie Wright with Neville Chamberlain. Chamberlain rewarded him with both goals in a 2–0 victory over Crewe Alexandra at Gresty Road. A 5–0 thrashing of Northampton Town followed eight days later, with both Chamberlain and Wright claiming a brace. However the following week they were 'massacred' 7–1 at high-flying Huddersfield Town's Leeds Road. Despite this, Trevor Dance retained his place in goal, with John Connaughton 'in a huff' with the club. By the end of September, Bloor was made manager on a permanent basis. Vale celebrated with a 5–1 beating of Rochdale, whilst Ken Todd was sold to Portsmouth for £20,000. Ged Stenson had his contract cancelled, and signed with Morecambe. Losing five of their seven games in October, Vale drifted to third-from-bottom. Bloor spent £30,000 on Crewe Alexandra defender Paul Bowles. Undefeated in November in the league, Vale then lost 5–1 to York City at Bootham Crescent. Later in the month, Vale became the first Fourth Division club to strike a shirt advertising deal, signing a deal with TI Creda for £5,000. A surprise came though when Bloor resigned his position, stating that "I do not have what  it takes". Gordon Banks was also dismissed, and he blamed the players for his downfall, claiming they did not like hard work. Bill Bentley was appointed as caretaker-manager, as the club approached numerous managers – including former player Ronnie Allen. The job went to John McGrath, who had been working as a coach at Southampton. He appointed Torquay United coach John Rudge as his second in command.

Finding his new team to be undisciplined, McGrath said 'the holiday is over', and began fining players for various reasons. He offloaded Connaughton to Altrincham, loaned Paul Bowles to Southampton, and discovered that Wright was no longer willing to play for the club. In February, McGrath signed goalkeeper Mark Harrison and defender Lee Harwood from Southampton, as well as forward Tony Sealy on loan from Crystal Palace. He also placed fifteen players on the transfer list, after which the Vale went on a six-game unbeaten run. Harwood and Phil Sproson made a solid defensive pair, whilst young Mark Chamberlain (brother of Neville) was used in midfield. The end of their run was a 2–2 draw with league leaders Walsall. In March John Fleming arrived on loan from Lincoln City, and the club went on a run of one win in twelve games, ending with a 2–1 defeat at Vale Park to fellow strugglers York City. In April, Felix Healy left the club to return to his native Northern Ireland. A Sealy goal earned Vale two points in their penultimate game with Stockport County at Edgeley Park, and their final game was a 3–0 win over Doncaster Rovers in front of just 2,338 supporters. These wins took Vale out of the re-election zone on goal difference.

They finished in twentieth place with 36 points, finishing ahead of Hereford United in the re-election zone on goals scored.

Finances
On the financial side, a loss of £82,069 was recorded. The financial picture led Chairman Arthur McPherson to describe 1979–80 as 'probably the worst season in the club's history'. Leaving the club at the end of the season were: Bernie Wright (Kidderminster Harriers); Bill Bentley (Stafford Rangers); Terry Owen (Northwich Victoria); Bob Delgado (Miami Americans); and Kevin Tully (Chorley). Several players remained in Burslem on virtue of having extended contracts.

Cup competitions
In the FA Cup, Vale were knocked out in the First Round after losing 3–1 at home to Doncaster Rovers.

In the League Cup, Vale were defeated by Tranmere Rovers 3–1 on aggregate.

League table

Results
Port Vale's score comes first

Football League Fourth Division

Results by matchday

Matches

FA Cup

League Cup

Player statistics

Appearances

Top scorers

Transfers

Transfers in

Transfers out

Loans in

Loans out

References
Specific

General

Port Vale F.C. seasons
Port Vale